Hira may refer to:

Places
Cave of Hira, a cave associated with Muhammad
Al-Hirah, an ancient Arab city in Iraq
 Battle of Hira, 633AD, between the Sassanians and the Rashidun Caliphate
Hira Mountains, Japan
Hira, New Zealand, settlement north-east of Nelson, New Zealand
Hira (ghetto), an old Jewish ghetto in Tunis, see History of the Jews in Tunisia
Hira (Greece), an ancient Greek settlement

Other uses
Hira (surname)
Hira (given name)
Hira (mythical monster), among the Songhai people of West Africa
The Hira Company Ltd, the parent company of Texet Sales Ltd, a British distributor of calculators and electronic devices
 HIRA, a gene
 Hazard Identification and Risk Assessment, a technique used to identify add address occupational safety and health risks
"Hira", a song by Redgum from their 1984 album Frontline
Health Insurance Review and Assessment Service (HIRA), a government agency in South Korea
, the ISO 15924 script code for Hiragana

See also 
 Heera (disambiguation)